Elections to Trafford Council were held on Thursday, 6 May 1982.  One third of the council was up for election, with each successful candidate to serve a four-year term of office, expiring in 1986. The Conservative Party retained overall control of the council.

After the election, the composition of the council was as follows:

Ward results

References

1982 English local elections
1982
1980s in Greater Manchester
May 1982 events in the United Kingdom